Eyes of Innocence is the 8th studio album released by the Miami Sound Machine, and their first English language studio album, released in 1984.

Background
Eyes of Innocence was the first mainstream release by the Miami Sound Machine. It became the band's breakthrough album due to the success of the lead single, "Dr. Beat", a top 20 hit in Australia, the United Kingdom and other places in Europe. "Dr. Beat" was the most successful cut from the album; the song utilizes synthesizers and dance rhythms of the time, but distinguished itself from other pop music of the era through the inclusion of Latin sounds.

The second single, "Prisoner of Love", was released exclusively to the European market. However, the song, which had a similar sound to the previous single, was a commercial failure, only reaching number #98 in the UK Singles Chart. Due to the failure of "Prisoner of Love", a different single was released to the American market, "I Need a Man", but it failed to enter any major charts. "I Need Your Love" was issued as a final promo single in the Philippines, again, it failed to impact any chart.

Many of the songs from the album were originally written in Spanish and translated into English, including "Orange Express", which was the main song of the band's previous album A Toda Máquina, and "I Need Your Love", a translation of the song "Regresa a Mí".

As of 2008, Eyes of Innocence has sold more than one million copies worldwide.

Track listing

Personnel

Musicians
Gloria Estefan – lead vocal, background vocals
Emilio Estefan Jr. – percussion
Enrique "Kiki" Garcia – drums
Juan Marcos Avila – bass guitar
Wesley B. Wright – guitar
Roger Fisher – keyboards
Gustavo Lezcano – harmonica
Luis Perez – trombone
Victor Lopez, Leo Villar – trumpet
Betty Cortez – synthesizer
Rubens Basini – guest musician
Joe Galdo – guest musician
Eddie Calle – guest musician
Lawrence Dermer – guest musician
Pablo Flores – guest musician
John Morales – guest musician
Sammy Vargas – guest musician

Production
Emilio Estefan Jr. – producer
 Miami Sound Machine – arranger
Hector Garrido – arranger
Lou Pace – arranger
William Sanchez – arranger
Engineer & Mixing: Eric Schilling – engineer, mixing
Joe Arlotta – engineer, mixing
Ted Stein – assistant
Sean Chambers – assistant
Sebastian Krys – assistant
Mark Krieg – assistant
Andrew Roshberg – assistant
Noel Harris – assistant
Geoff Foster – assistant
Lance Phillips – assistant
Javier Vacas – assistant

Design
Alex Sanchez – cover design
Al Freddy – photography
Samy – hair and makeup

Chart positions

Certifications

Release history

References

External links
 90millas.com (Official Album Website)

1984 albums
Miami Sound Machine albums
Epic Records albums
Albums produced by Emilio Estefan